École supérieure du bois (ESB) a French engineering College created in 1934.

The education provided concerns wood trades and techniques, but also human sciences, management, law, business policy and foreign languages.

Located in Nantes since 1993, the ESB is a private higher education institution of general interest recognised by the State. The school is a member of the Union of Independent Grandes Écoles (UGEI).

References

External links
 École supérieure du bois

Engineering universities and colleges in France
ESB
Universities and colleges in Nantes
Educational institutions established in 1934
1934 establishments in France